Lolita Muzeya (born 11 January 1991) is a Zambian professional boxer who held the WBC Silver female welterweight title in 2016.

Professional career
Muzeya made her professional debut on 23 March 2013, scoring a four-round unanimous decision (UD) victory against Agness Mtimaukanena at the Government Complex in Lusaka, Zambia.

After compiling a record of 10–0 (3 KOs), she defeated Mtimaukanena for a second time, winning via third-round technical knockout (TKO) to capture the vacant WBC Silver female welterweight on 14 October 2016, at the International Conference Center in Harare, Zimbabwe.

In September it was announced that Muzeya will challenge reigning champion Savannah Marshall for the WBO female middleweight title on 16 October 2021, at the Utilita Arena in Newcastle, England.

Professional boxing record

References

External links

Living people
1991 births
Zambian boxers
Welterweight boxers
Middleweight boxers
People from North-Western Province, Zambia